Sacrificed Women (Spanish:Mujeres sacrificadas) is a 1952 Mexican drama film directed by Alberto Gout and starring Ninón Sevilla, Roberto Cañedo and Víctor Junco.

The film's art direction was by Manuel Fontanals.

Cast
 Ninón Sevilla as Gracierla Montero  
 Roberto Cañedo as Octavio  
 Víctor Junco as Mario Galindo 
 Anita Blanch as Ana, madre de Graciela  
 Manuel Casanueva as Hombre de negro  
 Gloria Cansino 
 Waldo Custodio as Empresario francés  
 Felipe Montoya as Señor juez  
 Joaquín Roche as Agente de ministerio público  
 Roberto G. Rivera as Carlos  
 Celia Viveros as Maestra  
 Armando Arriola 
 Roberto Meyer as Doctor  
 Víctor Velázquez 
 Arturo Soto Urena 
 Agustín Lara as Cantante  
 Mona Gildes as Cantante  
 Consuelo Vidal as Cantante  
 Jimmy Romany
 Daniel Arroyo as Hombre en baile  
 Jorge Chesterking as Hombre en baile  
 Leonor Gómez as Mujer en comisaría  
 Cecilia Leger as Enfermera  
 Pepe Martínez as Mesero 
 Ángel Merino as Joaquín

References

Bibliography 
 Rogelio Agrasánchez. Carteles de la época de oro del cine mexicano. Archivo Fílmico Agrasánchez, 1997.

External links 
 

1952 films
1952 drama films
Mexican drama films
1950s Spanish-language films
Films directed by Alberto Gout
1950s Mexican films